West Vancouver-Sea to Sky (name in effect from April 2009 onwards, previously West Vancouver-Garibaldi from 1991 to 2009) is a provincial electoral district for the Legislative Assembly of British Columbia, Canada.

For other current and historical North Shore and City of Vancouver ridings, please see Vancouver (electoral districts).

Demographics

Geography

History

Members of the Legislative Assembly 
Its MLA is Jordan Sturdy, a former mayor of Pemberton.  He was first elected in 2013.

Election results 
Final count following a judicial recount, as the difference between first and second place was within 1/500 of the total votes cast.

|-

|- bgcolor="white"
!align="right" colspan=3|Total Valid Votes
!align="right"|18,397
!align="right"|100
!align="right"|
|- bgcolor="white"
!align="right" colspan=3|Total Rejected Ballots
!align="right"|130
!align="right"|0.70
!align="right"|
|- bgcolor="white"
!align="right" colspan=3|Turnout
!align="right"|18,527
!align="right"|53.07
!align="right"|
|}

|-

|-

 
|NDP
|Lyle Douglas Fenton
|align="right"|4,947
|align="right"|21.09
|align="right"|+10.17
|align="right"|$11,812

|- bgcolor="white"
!align="right" colspan=3|Total Valid Votes
!align="right"|23,454
!align="right"|100
!align="right"|
|- bgcolor="white"
!align="right" colspan=3|Total Rejected Ballots
!align="right"|142
!align="right"|0.61
!align="right"|
|- bgcolor="white"
!align="right" colspan=3|Turnout
!align="right"|23,596
!align="right"|61.57
!align="right"|
|}

|-

|-

 
|NDP
|Barry MacLeod
|align="right"|2,330
|align="right"|10.92%
|align="right"|
|align="right"|$6,450

|- bgcolor="white"
!align="right" colspan=3|Total Valid Votes
!align="right"|21,330
!align="right"|100.00%
!align="right"|
|- bgcolor="white"
!align="right" colspan=3|Total Rejected Ballots
!align="right"|92
!align="right"|0.43%
!align="right"|
|- bgcolor="white"
!align="right" colspan=3|Turnout
!align="right"|21,422
!align="right"|68.19%
!align="right"|
|}

|-

 
|NDP
|Brenda Broughton
|align="right"|6,288
|align="right"|29.16%
|align="right"|
|align="right"|$33,235
|-

|Natural Law
|David Grayson
|align="right"|36
|align="right"|0.17%
|align="right"|
|align="right"|$125
|- bgcolor="white"
!align="right" colspan=3|Total Valid Votes
!align="right"|21,562
!align="right"|100.00%
!align="right"|
|- bgcolor="white"
!align="right" colspan=3|Total Rejected Ballots
!align="right"|102
!align="right"|0.47%
!align="right"|
|- bgcolor="white"
!align="right" colspan=3|Turnout
!align="right"|21,664
!align="right"|73.03%
!align="right"|
|}

|-

 
|NDP
|Brian D. Giles
|align="right"|4,506
|align="right"|23.52%
|align="right"|
|align="right"|$20,080
|-

|}

References

External links 
Riding Map
BC Stats Profile - 2001
Results of 2001 election (pdf)
2001 Expenditures
Results of 1996 election
1996 Expenditures
Results of 1991 election
1991 Expenditures
Website of the Legislative Assembly of British Columbia

British Columbia provincial electoral districts
Bowen Island
Squamish, British Columbia
West Vancouver
Whistler, British Columbia
Provincial electoral districts in Greater Vancouver and the Fraser Valley